This page is a list of castles and castle ruins in Austria, arranged by state. A Burgruine is a ruined castle, a “castle ruin”.

Burgenland 
 Burg Bernstein
 Burg Forchtenstein
 Burg Güssing
 Burgruine Landsee
 Burg Lockenhaus
 Burg Schlaining

Carinthia

Lower Austria

Salzburg 

 Burgruine Edenvest
 Burg Finstergrün
 Burgruine Friedburg, Neukirchen am Großvenediger
 Burg Golling
 Burgruine Gutrat
 Burgruine Hieburg, Neukirchen am Großvenediger
 Festung Hohensalzburg, Salzburg
 Burg Hohenwerfen, Werfen
 Burg Mauterndorf
 Burg Moosham
 Burgruine Plainburg
 Burgruine Saalegg
 Castle Saalhof
 Burgruine Wartenfels
 Burgruine Weyer, Bramberg

Styria

Tyrol 

The Tyrol is named after Tirol Castle, which was formerly in Austria but is now in Italy.

 Ambras Palace
 Burg Bideneck
 Burg Bruck
 Burg Freundsberg
 Burg Heinfels
 Itter Castle
 Festung Kufstein
 Burg Kropfsberg
 Burg Laudegg
 Burg Lichtenwerth
 Kapsburg
 Kufstein Fortress
 Schloss Naudersberg
 Tratzberg Castle
 Wiesberg Castle

Upper Austria 

 Burg Altpernstein
 Burg Clam
 Eschelberg Castle
 Burg Neuhaus
 Schloss Orth
 Prandegg Castle
 Burg Pürnstein
 Rottenegg Castle
 Burg Vichtenstein

Vorarlberg 
 Burg Schattenburg
 Burg Neu-Ems
 Burgruine Neu-Montfort

See also
 List of castles

References

 
Austria
Castles
Austria
Castles